Chrysanthemum indicum is a flowering plant commonly called Indian chrysanthemum, within the family Asteraceae and genus Chrysanthemum.

Description
It usually blooms from August to October. It must be grown outside under sunlight with moist soil. They normally have yellow or white flowers with yellow pollen. It is suitable for light (sandy), medium (loamy) and heavy (clay) soils. Suitable pH: acid, neutral and basic (alkaline) soils.

Cultivation
Chrysanthemum indicum is a plant of the temperate zone but it can be grown successfully outside the area such as in tropical areas as it is often cultivated in Southeast Asia with moist soil (pH around 6.5) in sunny weather.

Propagation
Seeds can be sowed between the range of August to October.

Uses
 The flower heads are pickled in vinegar.
 Flowers themselves can be used in beverages (Geg Huay). 
 Young leaves can be used to make an aromatic tea.
 The seed contains about 16% of a semi-drying oil, but it's not viable yet.

References

indicum
Plants described in 1753
Taxa named by Carl Linnaeus